İsmet Taşdemir (born 1 January 1974) is a Turkish football coach and former player who is currently the manager of Bodrumspor.

References

1974 births
Living people
Turkish footballers
Ümraniyespor footballers
Denizlispor footballers
İstanbulspor footballers
Kayserispor footballers
Samsunspor footballers
MKE Ankaragücü footballers
Akçaabat Sebatspor footballers
Mardinspor footballers
Türk Telekom G.S.K. footballers
Turkish football managers
Türk Telekom GSK managers
MKE Ankaragücü managers
Altay S.K. managers
Samsunspor managers
Ankaraspor managers
Association football midfielders